Beth Louisa Morgan (born 27 September 1981) is a former English cricketer who played as a right-handed batter and right-arm medium bowler. She appeared in seven Test matches, 72 One Day Internationals and 28 Twenty20 Internationals for England between 1999 and 2011. She was a member of the team which retained the Ashes in Australia in 2008, and won the World Cup and World T20 in 2009. She played domestic cricket for Middlesex, Surrey Stars and South Australia.

Early and personal life
Morgan was born on the 27 September 1981 in Harrow, Greater London. Her uncle is the former test cricketer Eddie Hemmings who played for England 16 times, who Morgan has said is great to have on the end of the phone for support. When at Nower Hill High School in Pinner, she played for the otherwise all male team, helping them win the Harrow cup against local rivals Hatch End.

Domestic career
Morgan played for Middlesex from 1996 to 2019. She played 187 limited-overs and Twenty20 matches for the side, and was the only player to play in every season of the Women's County Championship. She also played one season for the Surrey Stars in the Kia Super League, and two seasons for South Australia.

International career
Morgan played seven test matches, 72 one day internationals and 28 T20Is for England. She was a member of England's victorious team in the 2009 World Twenty20 competition, and scored a vital unbeaten 46 from 34 balls in the defeat of Australia in the semi-final. She made her maiden test fifty against Australia in the one-off Ashes test the same year, scoring 58 in almost six hours at the crease. Due to shoulder injury, she retired from international cricket on 15 January 2013.

References

External links
 

1981 births
Living people
Cricketers from Greater London
England women Test cricketers
England women One Day International cricketers
England women Twenty20 International cricketers
Middlesex women cricketers
South Australian Scorpions cricketers
Surrey Stars cricketers